Profundimitra taylori is a species of sea snail, a marine gastropod mollusk, in the family Mitridae, the miters or miter snails.

Description
The length of the shell attains 24.15 mm.

Distribution
This marine species occurs off Papua New Guinea.

References

External links
 Fedosov A., Puillandre N., Herrmann M., Kantor Yu., Oliverio M., Dgebuadze P., Modica M.V. & Bouchet P. (2018). The collapse of Mitra: molecular systematics and morphology of the Mitridae (Gastropoda: Neogastropoda). Zoological Journal of the Linnean Society. 183(2): 253-337

taylori
Gastropods described in 2018